The YM2610, a.k.a. OPNB, is a sound chip developed by Yamaha. It is a member of Yamaha's OPN family of FM synthesis chips, and related to the YM2608.

The YM2610 was used in Taito's arcade system boards from 1987, including the Taito Z System. It was most notably used in SNK's Neo Geo arcade and home video game systems from 1990, along with other arcade game systems.

The YM2610 has the following features:

Four concurrent FM synthesis channels (voices)
Four operators per channel
Two interval timers
A low frequency oscillator (LFO)
Three SSG square wave tone/noise channels: compatible with YM2149
Seven adaptive differential pulse-code modulation (PCM) channels:
ADPCM-A: Six ADPCM channels, fixed pitch, 18.5 kHz sampling rate at 12-bit from 4-bit data
ADPCM-B: One ADPCM channel, variable pitch, 2–55.5 kHz sampling rate at 16-bit from 4-bit data

The YM2610B variant added two extra FM channels for a total of six, but was identical in every other feature. The YM2610 is used in conjunction with a YM3016 stereo DAC.

See also 
Yamaha YM2149
Yamaha YM2203
Yamaha YM2608
Yamaha YM2612

References 

 YM2610 Datasheet

YM2610
Video game music technology